Lower Hunter, an electoral district of the Legislative Assembly in the Australian state of New South Wales was created in 1859 and abolished in 1880.


Election results

Elections in the 1870s

1877 by-election

1877

1875

1872

Elections in the 1860s

1869

1864

1861 by-election

1860

Elections in the 1850s

1859

References

New South Wales state electoral results by district